Rohov is a village and municipality in Senica District in the Trnava Region of western Slovakia.

History
In historical records the village was first mentioned in 1471.

Geography
The municipality lies at an altitude of 240 metres and covers an area of 4.568 km². It has a population of about 381 people.

References

External links

 Official page

Villages and municipalities in Senica District